Dorel Balint (born 14 January 1969) is a retired Romanian football defender.

References

External links

1969 births
Living people
Romanian footballers
Liga I players
Nemzeti Bajnokság I players
FC Brașov (1936) players
ASC Oțelul Galați players
Budapest Honvéd FC players
Association football defenders
Romanian expatriate footballers
Expatriate footballers in Hungary
Romanian expatriate sportspeople in Hungary